The Voice is a Hong Kong reality show style singing competition broadcast by TVB, and also selects Hong Kong's representative to the New Talent Singing Awards International Finals.

The first season was presented by cantopop singer Prudence Liew and aired from July 19, 2009 to February 7, 2010. Wen Wang (王雯) was the winner. Sammy Leung and Kristal Tin were the main presenters starting season two, which aired May 9, 2010 to September 12, 2010. Mag Lam was the winner. Season 3 premiered on August 14, 2011 following the conclusion of the talk show, Say What (吹水同鄉會).

Format
Contestants sing one song per round of competition, which depending on the length, will be broadcast within one or two episodes.  After their individual performances, a panel of judges (between four and six, depending on the round) will critique and score each contestant.  During the first half of the season, the scoring structure is on a five-point scale, with the final score being the sum of the judges total.  As for the latter half of the season, each judge can award up to 100 points, with the final score being the average of the judges' scores.

Depending on the round of competition, contestants are eliminated based on one of three pre-set criteria:
 Having a set number of the lowest scoring contestants (usually between two and four) eliminated;
 Having a minimum score threshold where a contestant must achieve in order to survive the round;
 In dual rounds, contestants that score lower than their challengers are eliminated.  If two contestants are battling against each other, the lower scoring contestant is eliminated.

However, there are some rounds where no contestants are eliminated and instead they are competing for prizes.

Season 1 (2009-2010)
An open audition call selects 100 contestants to enter the preliminaries of the show, which is broadcast in the first episode of the program.  From there, the six judges responsible for the preliminaries each select five contestants as the final 30 to be on the show.

At the halfway point of the season, contestants eliminated during the first half had an opportunity to re-join the competition in what is called "The Resurrection Battle".  During this round, the four highest scoring contestants are re-instated in the competition.

Guest presenters
 Gary Chaw (Episodes 4-6; 28)
 Sammy Leung (Episodes 7-11; 28; Graduation concert)
 Louis Cheung (Episodes 12, 16-28; Graduation concert)
 Amigo Choi (Episodes  13-15)
 Harlem Yu (Episodes 24-25)
King Kong (Episodes 26-27)

Season 1 main presenter Prudence Liew was relieved of her hosting duties as of episode 26.  Liew, who is signed under the Universal Music Group label Cinepoly Records, is part of the group of cantopop singers banned from appearing on TVB programming as part of the conflict between the television station and the Hong Kong Recording Industry Alliance over song royalties.  Her replacement presenter for episodes 26 to 27 was Hong Kong based Taiwanese presenter King Kong (金剛).

Judges

Results
Winner: Wen Wang 王　雯
First Runner-Up: Cherry Ho 何紫慧
Second Runner-Up: Wen Chao 趙　文
Most Outstanding Singer Award: Cherry Ho 何紫慧
Most Popular Award: Alfred Hui 許廷鏗
Most Vastly Improved Award: Auston Lam 林師傑
Most Moving Performance Award: Wei Han 韓　煒
Hong Kong's Representative to International Chinese New Talent Singing Championship 2009: Hong Kin Chan 陳康健
Hong Kin Chan pulled out of competing at New Talent due to sickness, therefore no Hong Kong representative competed in the contest for the first time in the history of New Talent Singing Awards.

During episodes 16 to 20 of season one, several singing competition winners from Mainland China and Taiwan challenged the original Hong Kong contestants in a dual round.  Each challenger battled against two local contestants.  If the challenger can win both rounds or at least win one round and tie one round, they were then invited to compete in The Voice for the remainder of the season.  Two of these challengers ended up in the top three at the end of season one, with Wen Wang 王雯 winning the competition and Wen Chao 趙文 in third place.

Season 2 (2010)
The show went through a makeover for season 2.  The major difference being the open audition call now selects twenty contestants, cancelling the preliminary round of 100 competitors.  The season premiere began with these twenty contestants.  Also, no Resurrection Battle took place this season.

Guest presenters
 Mimi Lo (Episode 13)
 Louis Yuen (Episode 16-17)

Judges

Results
Winner: (15) Mag Lam 林欣彤
First Runner-Up: (4) Hubert Wu 胡鴻鈞
Second Runner-Up: (6) Sheldon Lo 羅孝勇
Internet Popularity Award: (15) Mag Lam 林欣彤
Most Vastly Improved Award: (4) Hubert Wu 胡鴻鈞
Favourite Song Performance Award:
 (15) Mag Lam 林欣彤 performing "愛請問怎麼走"
 (10) James Ng 吳業坤 performing "夢一場"
 (7) Vivian Chan 陳慧敏 performing "歲月的童話"
Hong Kong's Representative to International Chinese New Talent Singing Championship 2010: (4) Hubert Wu 胡鴻鈞

Season 3 (2011)
Season 3 saw some minor changes in the rules and regulations.  An age restriction was added limiting applicants to between the ages of 15 and 30.  Also, vocal group entries of up to eight people are now allowed to compete.  The season premiere was aired on August 14, 2011 and began with 18 contestants.

Judges

Results
Winner: (18) Jerry Liu 廖仲謙
First Runner-Up: (1) Jay Fung 馮允謙
Second Runner-Up: (3) Carrie Tam 譚嘉儀
Internet Popularity Award: (1) Jay Fung 馮允謙
Most Vastly Improved Award: (3) Carrie Tam 譚嘉儀
Favourite Song Performance Award:
 (1) Jay Fung 馮允謙 ft. Sheldon Lo 羅孝勇 performing "I'm Yours"
 (18) Jerry Liu 廖仲謙 performing "我的天"
 (3) Carrie Tam 譚嘉儀 performing "多得他"
Hong Kong's Representative to International Chinese New Talent Singing Championship 2011: (18) Jerry Liu 廖仲謙

See also
 New Talent Singing Awards
 One Million Star
 Super Girl (contest)
 Super Boy (contest)
 Minutes to Fame
 The Voice (TV series)

References

Hong Kong
2009 Hong Kong television series debuts
Cantopop
TVB original programming